Eatonville may refer to:
 Eatonville, Florida, United States
 Eatonville, Minnesota, United States, an alternative name for the former Dakota village Ḣeyate Otuŋwe
 Eatonville, Mississippi, United States
 Eatonville, Ontario, a neighbourhood of the city of Toronto, Canada
 Eatonville, Nova Scotia, Canada, a ghost town
 Eatonville, Washington, United States